Wilfred Burne (13 May 1903 – 12 August 1989) was a British diver. He competed in the men's 10 metre platform event at the 1928 Summer Olympics.

References

1903 births
1989 deaths
British male divers
Olympic divers of Great Britain
Divers at the 1928 Summer Olympics
Place of birth missing